Sandy Lake Water Aerodrome  is located on Sandy Lake, adjacent to the Sandy Lake First Nation, Ontario, Canada.

See also
 Sandy Lake Airport

References

Registered aerodromes in Kenora District
Seaplane bases in Ontario